This is a list of Princeton Tigers football players in the NFL Draft.

Key

Selections

References

Princeton

Princeton Tigers NFL Draft